Estadio del Argentino de Merlo is a stadium in Merlo, Buenos Aires. It is used for football matches and is the home stadium of Argentino de Merlo.

References

ar